Vertigo Entertainment is an American film and television production company based in Los Angeles, founded in 2001 by Roy Lee and Doug Davison.

History 
In 2001, after leaving BenderSpink, Roy Lee started Vertigo Entertainment with partner Doug Davison.

Originally, Vertigo Entertainment signed a first-look deal with Dimension Films to produce its feature films for three years.

In 2004, Vertigo signed a deal with Universal Pictures to produce many films per year. The deal was later terminated in 2008 during the 2007-08 Writers Guild of America strike. In 2007, the studio signed a deal with Lionsgate Television to produce shows for television.

In 2010, Vertigo signed a first-look deal with Warner Bros. to produce films.

In March 2013, Vertigo signed a two-year first-look deal with Fox 21 to develop projects for cable.

In December 2015, Vertigo expanded their partnership with Warner Bros. to include a two-year exclusive deal for drama and comedy series.

In November 2017, Vertigo signed a multi-year first-look deal with Sony Pictures Television, including  drama, comedy and unscripted programs for network, cable and streaming.

In 2020, Vertigo signed a deal with Lionsgate to produce films.

Filmography

Theatrical films

2000s

2010s

2020s

Upcoming

Television series

2000s

2010s

2020s

Upcoming

References 

2001 establishments in California
American companies established in 2001
Mass media companies established in 2001
Film production companies of the United States
Companies based in Los Angeles